Precision agriculture (PA) is a farming management strategy based on observing, measuring and responding to temporal and spatial variability to improve agricultural production sustainability. It is used in both crop and livestock production. Precision agriculture often employs technologies to automate agricultural operations, improving their diagnosis, decision-making or performing. First conceptual work on PA and practical applications go back in the late 1980s. The goal of precision agriculture research is to define a decision support system (DSS) for whole farm management with the goal of optimizing returns on inputs while preserving resources.

Among these many approaches is a phytogeomorphological approach which ties multi-year crop growth stability/characteristics to topological terrain attributes. The interest in the phytogeomorphological approach stems from the fact that the geomorphology component typically dictates the hydrology of the farm field.

The practice of precision agriculture has been enabled by the advent of GPS and GNSS. The farmer's and/or researcher's ability to locate their precise position in a field allows for the creation of maps of the spatial variability of as many variables as can be measured (e.g. crop yield, terrain features/topography, organic matter content, moisture levels, nitrogen levels, pH, EC, Mg, K, and others). Similar data is collected by sensor arrays mounted on GPS-equipped combine harvesters. These arrays consist of real-time sensors that measure everything from chlorophyll levels to plant water status, along with multispectral imagery. This data is used in conjunction with satellite imagery by variable rate technology (VRT) including seeders, sprayers, etc. to optimally distribute resources. However, recent technological advances have enabled the use of real-time sensors directly in soil, which can wirelessly transmit data without the need of human presence.

Precision agriculture has also been enabled by unmanned aerial vehicles that are relatively inexpensive and can be operated by novice pilots.  These agricultural drones can be equipped with multispectral or RGB cameras to capture many images of a field that can be stitched together using photogrammetric methods to create orthophotos. These multispectral images contain multiple values per pixel in addition to the traditional red, green blue values such as near infrared and red-edge spectrum values used to process and analyze vegetative indexes such as NDVI maps. These drones are capable of capturing imagery and providing additional geographical references such as elevation, which allows software to perform map algebra functions to build precise topography maps. These topographic maps can be used to correlate crop health with topography, the results of which can be used to optimize crop inputs such as water, fertilizer or chemicals such as herbicides and growth regulators through variable rate applications.

History

Precision agriculture is a key component of the third wave of modern agricultural revolutions.  The first agricultural revolution was the increase of mechanized agriculture, from 1900 to 1930. Each farmer produced enough food to feed about 26 people during this time. The 1960s prompted the Green Revolution with new methods of genetic modification, which led to each farmer feeding about 156 people. It is expected that by 2050, the global population will reach about 9.6 billion, and food production must effectively double from current levels in order to feed every mouth. With new technological advancements in the agricultural revolution of precision farming, each farmer will be able to feed 265 people on the same acreage.

Overview
The first wave of the precision agricultural revolution came in the forms of satellite and aerial imagery, weather prediction, variable rate fertilizer application, and crop health indicators. The second wave aggregates the machine data for even more precise planting, topographical mapping, and soil data.

Precision agriculture aims to optimize field-level management with regard to:
 crop science: by matching farming practices more closely to crop needs (e.g. fertilizer inputs);
 environmental protection: by reducing environmental risks and footprint of farming (e.g. limiting leaching of nitrogen);
 economics: by boosting competitiveness through more efficient practices (e.g. improved management of fertilizer usage and other inputs).
Precision agriculture also provides farmers with a wealth of information to:
 build up a record of their farm
 improve decision-making
 foster greater traceability
 enhance marketing of farm products
 improve lease arrangements and relationship with landlords
 enhance the inherent quality of farm products (e.g. protein level in bread-flour wheat)

Prescriptive planting
Prescriptive planting is a type of farming system that delivers data-driven planting advice that can determine variable planting rates to accommodate varying conditions across a single field, in order to maximize yield. It has been described as "Big Data on the farm." Monsanto, DuPont and others are launching this technology in the US.

Principles
Precision agriculture uses many tools but here are some of the basics: tractors, combines, sprayers, planters, diggers, which are all considered auto-guidance systems. The small devices on the equipment that uses GIS (geographic information system) are what makes precision agriculture what it is. You can think of the GIS system as the “brain.” To be able to use precision agriculture the equipment needs to be wired with the right technology and data systems. More tools include Variable rate technology (VRT), Global positioning system and Geographical information system, Grid sampling, and remote sensors.

Geolocating
Geolocating a field enables the farmer to overlay information gathered from analysis of soils and residual nitrogen, and information on previous crops and soil resistivity. Geolocation is done in two ways
 The field is delineated using an in-vehicle GPS receiver as the farmer drives a tractor around the field.
 The field is delineated on a basemap derived from aerial or satellite imagery. The base images must have the right level of resolution and geometric quality to ensure that geolocation is sufficiently accurate.

Variables 
Intra and inter-field variability may result from a number of factors. These include climatic conditions (hail, drought, rain, etc.), soils (texture, depth, nitrogen levels), cropping practices (no-till farming), weeds and disease.
Permanent indicators—chiefly soil indicators—provide farmers with information about the main environmental constants.
Point indicators allow them to track a crop's status, i.e., to see whether diseases are developing, if the crop is suffering from water stress, nitrogen stress, or lodging, whether it has been damaged by ice and so on.
This information may come from weather stations and other sensors (soil electrical resistivity, detection with the naked eye, satellite imagery, etc.).
Soil resistivity measurements combined with soil analysis make it possible to measure moisture content. Soil resistivity is also a relatively simple and cheap measurement.

Strategies 

Using soil maps, farmers can pursue two strategies to adjust field inputs:
 Predictive approach: based on analysis of static indicators (soil, resistivity, field history, etc.) during the crop cycle.
 Control approach: information from static indicators is regularly updated during the crop cycle by:
 sampling: weighing biomass, measuring leaf chlorophyll content, weighing fruit, etc.
 remote sensing: measuring parameters like temperature (air/soil), humidity (air/soil/leaf), wind or stem diameter is possible thanks to Wireless Sensor Networks and Internet of things (IoT)
 proxy-detection: in-vehicle sensors measure leaf status; this requires the farmer to drive around the entire field.
 aerial or satellite remote sensing: multispectral imagery is acquired and processed to derive maps of crop biophysical parameters, including indicators of disease. Airborne instruments are able to measure the amount of plant cover and to distinguish between crops and weeds.
Decisions may be based on decision-support models (crop simulation models and recommendation models) based on big data, but in the final analysis it is up to the farmer to decide in terms of business value and impacts on the environment- a role being takenover by artificial intelligence (AI) systems based on machine learning and artificial neural networks.

It is important to realize why PA technology is or is not adopted, "for PA technology adoption to occur the farmer has to perceive the technology as useful and easy to use. It might be insufficient to have positive outside data on the economic benefits of PA technology as perceptions of farmers have to reflect these economic considerations."

Implementing practices 
New information and communication technologies make field level crop management more operational and easier to achieve for farmers.
Application of crop management decisions calls for agricultural equipment that supports variable-rate technology (VRT), for example varying seed density along with variable-rate application (VRA) of nitrogen and phytosanitary products.

Precision agriculture uses technology on agricultural equipment (e.g. tractors, sprayers, harvesters, etc.):
 positioning system (e.g. GPS receivers that use satellite signals to precisely determine a position on the globe);
 geographic information systems (GIS), i.e., software that makes sense of all the available data;
 variable-rate farming equipment (seeder, spreader).

Usage around the world 

The concept of precision agriculture first emerged in the United States in the early 1980s. In 1985, researchers at the University of Minnesota varied lime inputs in crop fields. It was also at this time that the practice of grid sampling appeared (applying a fixed grid of one sample per hectare). Towards the end of the 1980s, this technique was used to derive the first input recommendation maps for fertilizers and pH corrections. The use of yield sensors developed from new technologies, combined with the advent of GPS receivers, has been gaining ground ever since. Today, such systems cover several million hectares.

In the American Midwest (US), it is associated not with sustainable agriculture but with mainstream farmers who are trying to maximize profits by spending money only in areas that require fertilizer. This practice allows the farmer to vary the rate of fertilizer across the field according to the need identified by GPS guided Grid or Zone Sampling. Fertilizer that would have been spread in areas that don't need it can be placed in areas that do, thereby optimizing its use.

Around the world, precision agriculture developed at a varying pace. Precursor nations were the United States, Canada and Australia. In Europe, the United Kingdom was the first to go down this path, followed closely by France, where it first appeared in 1997–1998. In Latin America the leading country is Argentina, where it was introduced in the middle 1990s with the support of the National Agricultural Technology Institute. Brazil established a state-owned enterprise, Embrapa, to research and develop sustainable agriculture. The development of GPS and variable-rate spreading techniques helped to anchor precision farming management practices. Today, less than 10% of France's farmers are equipped with variable-rate systems. Uptake of GPS is more widespread, but this hasn't stopped them using precision agriculture services, which supplies field-level recommendation maps.

While digital technologies can transform the landscape of agricultural machinery, making mechanization both more precise and more accessible, non-mechanized production is still dominant in many low- and middle-income countries, especially in sub-Saharan Africa. Research on precision agriculture for non-mechanized production is increasing and so is its adoption. Examples include the AgroCares hand-held soil scanner, uncrewed aerial vehicle (UAV) services (also known as drones), and GNSS to map field boundaries and establish land tenure. However, it is not clear how many agricultural producers actually use digital technologies.

Precision livestock farming supports farmers in real-time by continuously monitoring and controlling animal productivity, environmental impacts, and health and welfare parameters. Sensors attached to animals or to barn equipment operate climate control and monitor animals’ health status, movement and needs. For example, cows can be tagged with the electronic identification (EID) that allows a milking robot to access a database of udder coordinates for specific cows. Global automatic milking system sales have increased over recent years, but adoption is likely mostly in Northern Europe, and likely almost absent in low- and middle-income countries. Automated feeding machines for both cows and poultry also exist, but data and evidence regarding their adoption trends and drivers is likewise scarce.

The economic and environmental benefits of precision agriculture have also been confirmed in China, but China is lagging behind countries such as Europe and the United States because the Chinese agricultural system is characterized by small-scale family-run farms, which makes the adoption rate of precision agriculture lower than other countries. Therefore, China is trying to better introduce precision agriculture technology into its own country and reduce some risks, paving the way for China's technology to develop precision agriculture in the future.

Economic and environmental impacts
Precision agriculture, as the name implies, means application of precise and correct amount of inputs like water, fertilizer, pesticides etc. at the correct time to the crop for increasing its productivity and maximizing its yields. Precision agriculture management practices can significantly reduce the amount of nutrient and other crop inputs used while boosting yields. Farmers thus obtain a return on their investment by saving on water, pesticide, and fertilizer costs.

The second, larger-scale benefit of targeting inputs concerns environmental impacts.  Applying the right amount of chemicals in the right place and at the right time benefits crops, soils and groundwater, and thus the entire crop cycle.  Consequently, precision agriculture has become a cornerstone of sustainable agriculture, since it respects crops, soils and farmers.  Sustainable agriculture seeks to assure a continued supply of food within the ecological, economic and social limits required to sustain production in the long term.

A 2013 article tried to show that precision agriculture can help farmers in developing countries like India.

Precision agriculture reduces the pressure by the agriculture on the environment by increasing the efficiency of machinery and putting it into use. For example, the use of remote management devices such as GPS reduces fuel consumption for agriculture, while variable rate application of nutrients or pesticides can potentially reduce the use of these inputs, thereby saving costs and reducing harmful runoff into the waterways.

Emerging technologies
Precision agriculture is an application of breakthrough digital farming technologies. Over $4.6 billion has been invested in agriculture tech companies—sometimes called agtech.

Robots
Self-steering tractors have existed for some time now, as John Deere equipment works like a plane on autopilot. The tractor does most of the work, with the farmer stepping in for emergencies.  Technology is advancing towards driverless machinery programmed by GPS to spread fertilizer or plow land. Autonomy of technology is driven by the demanding need of diagnoses, often difficult to accomplish solely by hands-on farmer-operated machinery. In many instances of high rates of production, manual adjustments cannot sustain. Other innovations include, partly solar powered, machines/robots that identify weeds and precisely kill them with a dose of a herbicide or lasers.

Agricultural robots, also known as AgBots, already exist, but advanced harvesting robots are being developed to identify ripe fruits, adjust to their shape and size, and carefully pluck them from branches.

Drones and satellite imagery
Drone and satellite technology are used in precision farming. This often occurs when drones take high quality images while satellites capture the bigger picture. Aerial photography from light aircraft can be combined with data from satellite records to predict future yields based on the current level of field biomass. Aggregated images can create contour maps to track where water flows, determine variable-rate seeding, and create yield maps of areas that were more or less productive. Super resolution enhancement methods are seeing increased use in crop disease surveillance from low flying aircraft. Klapp et al. 2021 demonstrates a significantly improved infrared super-resolution method using a convolutional neural network.

The Internet of things
The Internet of things is the network of physical objects outfitted with electronics that enable data collection and aggregation. IoT comes into play with the development of sensors and farm-management software. For example, farmers can spectroscopically measure nitrogen, phosphorus, and potassium in liquid manure, which is notoriously inconsistent. They can then scan the ground to see where cows have already urinated and apply fertilizer to only the spots that need it. This cuts fertilizer use by up to 30%. Moisture sensors in the soil determine the best times to remotely water plants. The irrigation systems can be programmed to switch which side of tree trunk they water based on the plant's need and rainfall.

Innovations are not just limited to plants—they can be used for the welfare of animals. Cattle can be outfitted with internal sensors to keep track of stomach acidity and digestive problems. External sensors track movement patterns to determine the cow's health and fitness, sense physical injuries, and identify the optimal times for breeding. All this data from sensors can be aggregated and analyzed to detect trends and patterns.

As another example, monitoring technology can be used to make beekeeping more efficient. Honeybees are of significant economic value and provide a vital service to agriculture by pollinating a variety of crops. Monitoring of a honeybee colony's health via wireless temperature, humidity and  sensors helps to improve the productivity of bees, and to read early warnings in the data that might threaten the very survival of an entire hive.

Smartphone applications 

Smartphone and tablet applications are becoming increasingly popular in precision agriculture. Smartphones come with many useful applications already installed, including the camera, microphone, GPS, and accelerometer. There are also applications made dedicated to various agriculture applications such as field mapping, tracking animals, obtaining weather and crop information, and more. They are easily portable, affordable, and have high computing power.

Machine learning 
Machine learning is commonly used in conjunction with drones, robots, and internet of things devices. It allows for the input of data from each of these sources. The computer then processes this information and sends the appropriate actions back to these devices. This allows for robots to deliver the perfect amount of fertilizer or for IoT devices to provide the perfect quantity of water directly to the soil. Machine learning may also provide predictions to farmers at the point of need, such as the contents of plant-available nitrogen in soil, to guide fertilization planning. As more agriculture becomes ever more digital, machine learning will underpin efficient and precise farming with less manual labour.

Conferences
InfoAg Conference
European conference on Precision Agriculture (ECPA) (biennial)
International Conference on Precision Agriculture (ICPA) (biennial)

See also

Sources

Notes

External links 

 Precision agriculture, IBM

Agricultural revolutions
Agricultural soil science
Agricultural technology
Emerging technologies
Global Positioning System
Applications of geographic information systems